Rabbids Land is a Wii U game that was announced by Ubisoft at E3 2012. It is the seventh console installment of the Raving Rabbids series. The game was later ported to Japan for release on June 6, 2013. It received mixed reviews, with critics praising several mini-games but criticizing its board game play style.

The online services for the game were shut down on November 11, 2017.

Plot
Still on Earth, the Rabbids find themselves taking over an amusement park. Two Rabbids are attempting to go on one of the rides (not in disguise the first time, in disguise the second time as a dinosaur and in disguise the third time as a tall man), but are thrown out by an unseen person. One of the Rabbids contacts the Rabbid spaceship through an iPhone-like device. He tries to call the Rabbid in the spaceship, but the Rabbid in the spaceship is too busy playing with the Wii U GamePad. Unaware of the consequences, the Rabbid in the spaceship continues to play with the Gamepad, which was actually controlling the whole ship. The Rabbid turns the Gamepad upside down, which causes the ship to land in the amusement park.

Gameplay
Gameplay is similar to the Mario Party series. It features a board game-like scenario. The player will have to roll a dice with the Wii U Gamepad and depending on the number the dice lands, the Rabbid will move to the corresponding square. These squares trigger a different feature and can be easily told apart just by looking at the symbol drawn on the square. Your primary goal is to win the board game by winning trophies, which can be collected by playing and winning minigames. Once a player has collected all trophies needed, you need to get to the center. Once you get to the center, the game is over and the player can win prizes.

Although up to four players can take turns in the main game, only two players can play the minigames at a time.

Soundtrack
The music was composed by Jennifer Kes Remington. A 17-song soundtrack is available on the iTunes Music Store, and is based on the minigames played. Similar to the dance called "Here Comes The Hotstepper" by The Hit Crew from Just Dance 2, the game also includes licensed songs such as "Make the Party (Don't Stop)" by Bunny Beats (featuring Liquid) from Just Dance 4, "Dance All Nite" by Anja from Just Dance 3 and "Crazy Little Thing" from Just Dance 4, also by Anja.

Reception

Rabbids Land received "mixed" reviews, mostly because of its board game style of play, according to the review aggregation website Metacritic.

IGN called it "a mediocre party game mini-game collection." Nintendo Life praised its fun mini-games and amazing graphics and said, "if you don't mind the one-to one restriction of the mini-games, there's a lot of fun to be had here." They disliked a few mini-games saying "It's a few you can go without." They noted that the lack of attractions is disappointing. Game Informer called the Rabbids "party poopers". They disliked the tired infused board game concept and low replay value. They also stated that the animation was great, but overall the graphics weren't impressive, claiming that the game still could have been a Wii game. Nintendo World Report praised its fun couch multi-player, Off-TV Play and well-designed style, but criticized its low levels of difficulty, lack of creativity and disliked that only two players could play at a time.

References

External links
 

2012 video games
Digital board games
Party video games
Rabbids
Ubisoft games
Video games about rabbits and hares
Video games developed in France
Video games set in amusement parks
Wii U games
Wii U-only games
Wii U eShop games